Sky Academy is the title given to guitar innovator Uli Jon Roth's tuition seminars and concerts. 

Sky Academy was first established in May 2006, at the Ralph Freud Theater at the University Campus of Los Angeles.
Uli teaches a holistic approach to music making, which comprises lectures, master classes, concentration exercises and special concerts. The teaching emphasis is on awakening and strengthening the students' musical potential and on showing ways of how to connect more deeply with music. This is achieved largely through heightening the general musical awareness level and also by broadening the overall musical and artistic horizon of the students. Uli is seen as an Inspired Teacher who mainly teaches by opening up new vistas of inspiration. His teaching approach encourages the creative, artistic aspects of music making, and even embraces metaphysical subjects such as inspiration, but at the same time it doesn't neglect the importance of craftsmanship.

Guest teachers or speakers are another important part of Sky Academy.
Usually they tend to share the stage with Roth while he interviews them. 
So far these have included: Anrew Shulman (Principal Cellist Los Angeles Philharmonic, LA Chamber Orchestra & Conductor) - subjects: Cello, stringed instruments, conducting orchestras, 
Robby Krieger (The Doors) Subject: song-writing & Q&A, 
Bruce Dukhov (concert master of the Hollywood Bowl Orchestra)- subject: Violin playing, Bach Partita,
Ben Woods (Flametal) - Flamenco guitar and dance, 
Further guest speakers have been Michael-Angelo Batio, Joe Stump, Vernon Reid, Gilby Clarke, Leon Hendrix. 
  
Sky Academy 2006 included three extensive concerts which took place during the course of the 5-day seminar. They were designed to invoke the spirit of musical freedom and featured many special guests, apart from Uli's band.
Stage guests included Warren De Martini, Don Dokken, Tony Franklin, Rob Pagliari, Chris Poland, Kofi Baker, Chris Impellitteri, Jeff Scott Soto, Francis Buchholz and Robby Krieger. 

In August 2007 Uli held a further 2 Sky Academy concerts and seminar at the Hollywood MI with Paul Gilbert,  Michael Angelo Batio, Ule Ritgen, George Bellas, Roy Z, Robby Krieger, Mark Boals and Johnny Hiland.  

The first international Sky Academy was in July 2008, as part of the G-TARanaki Guitar Festival in New Plymouth, Taranaki, New Zealand. A different format to the US Sky Academy saw Uli giving three workshops at regional high schools in Waitara, Inglewood and Opunake with guests Gilby Clarke and Vernon Reid. Uli then headlined the TSB Stadium with his Sky Of Avalon band featuring a guesting Alex Skolnick.

A third Sky Academy US seminar  was held again in Los Angeles in September 2008, followed by Sky Academy Arizona and Nordenham (Germany). Guests at the concerts included Doug Aldrich and Chris Caffery.

External links 
Uli Jon Roth Announces 2008 Sky Academy Seminars, February 15, 2008.
The Official Uli Jon Roth Website
Musicmight Uli Jon Roth history
Sky Academy Website
The Official Uli Jon Roth Website News
The official registration and merchandise site of Sky Academy

Rock music groups from California
Musical groups from Los Angeles
Musical groups established in 2006